Governor Steele may refer to:

George Washington Steele (1839–1922), 1st Governor of Oklahoma Territory
John Hardy Steele (1789–1865), 19th Governor of New Hampshire
Robert Williamson Steele (1820–1901), Governor of the Territory of Jefferson